The Canadian Meat Council is Canada's national trade association for the federally inspected meat packers and processors. It is an industry trade group associated with the meat packing industry. Federally inspected plants account for over 90% of all the meat processed in Canada.

As a key component of Canada's agriculture sector, the meat industry is the largest contributor to Canada's food processing industry, employing almost 70,000 Canadians and representing 12% of Canada's agri-food exports.  It is also one of Canada's leading manufacturing sectors with annual sales of over $24 billion.

History 
A group of Ontario meat packers met in Toronto in August, 1919 to decide if an association is needed to represent the industry which underwent tremendous growth during and after World War I. With overwhelming support for the idea, Samuel E. "Sam" Todd was appointed to head the Council (then called as "The Industrial and Development Council of Canadian Meat Packers") on September 1, 1919. J. S. McLean was elected as the first president of the Council. E. B. Roberts, a journalist by profession was hired by beginning of 1920 to take care of the Councils media and publicity relations.

The first office of the organization was located at 186 King St. W., Toronto. Membership included Harris Abattoir Ltd., William Davies Co. Ltd., Swift Canadian Co. Ltd., Gunns Ltd., Canadian Packing Co Ltd., Puddys Ltd., F. W. Fearman Co., Ingersoll Packaging Co. Ltd., Whyte Packing Co. Ltd., Gallagher-Holman and Lafrance Co. Ltd., 
Gordon-Ironside & Fares Packers Ltd., Wilson Canadian Co. Ltd., and Armour and Company.

Meat Packers Council of Canada 
The Industrial and Development Council of Canadian Meat Packers was considered a lengthy name by many members and an alternate name "Meat Packers Council of Canada" was proposed. It was not until Sam Todd retired in 1952 that the name was officially changed to Meat Packers Council of Canada.

The council was "incorporated" as an association in 1961 after serving as a voluntary, unincorporated association for nearly 40 years.

Canadian Meat Council 
In 1980, the association changed its name to the Canadian Meat Council (Conseil des Viandes du Canada) during the second Presidence of ALLAN K. BESWICK.

COVID-19 and Centennial year 
During the COVID-19 pandemic, which happened during the centennial year of the Council, more than 50 "regular members" had paid their dues, including a lamb trade group from New Zealand as well as Cargill, JBS Foods International and the Ministry of Agriculture and Forestry of Alberta.

The Executive Members of the Council at the time were:
David Colwell (Chair) JBS Foods Canada
Troy Warren (Past Chair) Sure Good Foods 
Iain Stewart (Vice-Chair) Maple Leaf Foods
Matt Gibney (Secretary) Cargill Foods Limited 
David Flomen (Treasurer) Viscofan Canada

Publications 
Two booklets, Canadian Livestock Future and Better Livestock - The Nation's Welfare were published in the early 1920s.
A monthly series called " A letter on Canadian Livestock Products" was published since 1921.
Three editions of Food Service Meat Manual were published so far. The Third Edition is available currently from the Council.
A series of position papers on issues facing the Canadian Meat Industry are available only for the members of the Council.
Proceedings of the Technical Symposium of the Canadian Meat Science Association.

Events 
Annual Meetings are held every year since 1919. The meetings are one of the largest gathering of the Canadian Meat Industry's decision makers. Symposium and workshops on technical areas are held on need basis.

See also
North American Meat Processors Association
American Meat Institute
List of food industry trade associations

References

Bibliography 

MacLachlan, Ian. Kill and Chill: Restructuring Canada's Beef Commodity Chain (2001)
Rennie, James ed. The Growth and Development of Canada's Meat Packing Industry (1969) (Documentary)
MacLachlan, Ian. Meat-Processing Industry. [Historica The Canadian Encyclopedia].
The Meat Packers Council of Canada: A History of Dynamic Leadership. (Source: Unknown)

External links 
Canadian Meat Council Website
Canadian Meat Science Association
American Meat Institute

Food industry trade groups
Trade associations based in Canada
Meat processing in Canada
Agricultural organizations based in Canada
Meat industry organizations